These are the Billboard Hot Dance/Disco Club Play and Maxi-Singles Sales number-one hits of 2003.

See also
List of number-one dance airplay hits of 2003 (U.S.)
2003 in music
List of number-one dance hits (United States)
List of artists who reached number one on the U.S. Dance chart

References

2003
United States Dance
2003 in American music